2015–16 Eerste Klasse was a Dutch association football season of the Eerste Klasse.

Saturday champions were:
 DFS Opheusden
 SV Argon
 VV Smitshoek
 SDV Barneveld
 Oranje Nassau Groningen

Sunday champions were:
 VV Hoogland
 Ido's Football Club
 RKSV Nuenen
 VV Chevremont
 SC Woezik
 VV Heerenveen

References

Eerste Klasse seasons
Eerste Klasse